Dojang is a term used in Korean martial arts, such as Taekwondo, Tang Soo Do, Kuk Sool Won, and hapkido, that refers to a formal training hall. It is typically considered the formal gathering place for students of a martial art to conduct training, examinations and other related encounters.

Meaning
Do (道) means "the way" or "art" and jang (場) means "a place", which makes dojang the place where one practices the way. In the case of martial arts it is the place where one practices the path of that martial art, much like dojo in Japanese. More specific terms such as "hapkidojang" or "taekwondojang" can be used for particular subtypes of dojang. The word dojang (道場) originates from Buddhism. The dojang is a place where meditation and practice takes place in the temple; the same Chinese characters for dojang also mean a bodhimanda or (in Japanese) a dojo.

Decoration
The dojang walls can be decorated with a variety of items ranging from the national and federation flag to pictures and calligraphy and boards with the names of techniques practiced in the dojang on it. In general, Korean dojangs are usually heavily decorated.

In dojangs where the practice of the art may involve much falling, there will usually be mats on the floor. In older days the floor could also be covered with the sacks rice was stored in, but in modern days there are a variety of mats available.

At the beginning of class, students may line up according to their rankthe highest-ranking students at the front (first row) left and the lowest-ranking students at the back (last row) right from the point of view of the instructor facing the students (from the point of view of a student, facing the front of the dojang: the highest-ranking students at the front right and the lowest-ranking students at the back left). If several students are of the same rank, age or age of rank may determine their places in line.

Usage
The Korean word for gym is more commonly translated as Che Yuk Gwan (체육관, 體育館), which means "sports place". Dojang refers to the actual place in the gym where practice takes place.

The equivalent Japanese term for "dojang" is dōjō (道場), which means "place of the way", while the Chinese equivalent is wuguan (武館), which means "martial hall".

References 

Korean martial arts